Mirza Taghikhan Kashani (titled: Hakim-Bāshi Zill-ul-sultān) was an Iranian writer and journalist during 19th century, Qajar era. He was the first to print articles about necessity of youth training in Fars newspaper in Shiraz and Farhang in Isfahan.

See also
 Sani ol molk

References

Iranian writers
Iranian journalists
Year of birth missing
Year of death missing